Naik (Nk; sometimes historically spelled nayak) is an Indian Army, Pakistan Army and Bangladesh Police rank equivalent to corporal. In Tamil, the word naik was used to indicate a lord or governor prior to its use as an equivalent to corporal in British India.

The rank was previously used in the British Indian Army and the Camel Corps, ranking between lance naik and havildar. In cavalry units, the equivalent is lance daffadar. Like a British corporal, a naik wears two rank chevrons.

See also
 Army ranks and insignia of India
 Army ranks and insignia of Pakistan

References

External links 
 

Military ranks of British India
Pakistan Army ranks
Military ranks of the Indian Army